Oberea davaoensis is a species of beetle in the family Cerambycidae. It was first described by Stephan von Breuning in 1961.

References

davaoensis
Beetles described in 1961